Onze Lieve Vrouwekerk (Church of Our Lady)(Syriac: ܥܕܬܐ ܕܝܠܕܬ ܐܠܗܐ , Ito dyoldath Aloho) is a Syriac Orthodox church in the centre of Amsterdam. The church is used both by the Syriac Orthodox community and the Roman Catholic of Opus Dei. Emphasis is placed on the hearing of confessions and of choral liturgy. The building has the Dutch status of a Rijksmonument.

History 
The church was founded in 1854 by the Redemptorist Fathers and was designed by architect Theo Molkenboer. In 1985 the Redemptorists left the church due to the lack of redemptorist priests. The church was acquired by the Syriac Orthodox Church in the Netherlands and the parish was renamed to Moeder Godskerk (Church of the Mother of God). However, the church never closed its doors for the Roman and Surinam Catholic believers.

Services

Syriac Orthodox 
Saturday:
17.00 Vespers (16.30 during winter)
Sunday:
8.45 High Mass

Catholic 
Sunday:
19.00 Vigil Eucharist (Saturday evening)
11.15 High Mass with Gregorian choir, translation of the readings is available.
12.00 Eucharist for Italian Community in the Chapel nr. 218B-Except in summer, check web
13.00 Eucharist for the Surinam Community
18.00 Mass in English - Families with little children are welcome
Monday-Friday:
12.15 Eucharist in the Day Chapel
19.30 EucharistThursday:
11.00-12.15 Adoration of the Blessed Sacrament'every week from Thursday 13.00 until Friday at 20.00 also during the night Adoration of the Blessed SacramentConfession: half an hour before the daily masses a priest is available for confessions. Also during''' the High Mass on Sunday of 11.15. It is possible to make an appointment as well.

External links 

 http://www.moedergodskerk.nl/ 
 http://www.olvkerk.nl/
 

Our Lady
Roman Catholic churches in the Netherlands
Rijksmonuments in Amsterdam
Redemptorist churches
Former Roman Catholic church buildings
Syriac Orthodox churches
Oriental Orthodoxy in the Netherlands